Ivar Sandboe  is a Norwegian handball player.

He made his debut on the Norwegian national team in 1951, 
and played 26 matches for the national team between 1951 and 1958. He participated at the 1958 World Men's Handball Championship.

References

Year of birth missing (living people)
Living people
Norwegian male handball players